Beorn leggi is an extinct species of tardigrades, and the known first fossil tardigrade, discovered  and described in 1964 from Late Cretaceous amber from Manitoba, Canada. It is the only species in the genus Beorn, and family Beornidae. It is one of two fossil tardigrades known from the Cretaceous, the other being Milnesium swolenskyi from the Turonian New Jersey amber

In addition to some other finds from the Cretaceous and the Cambrian period, Beorn is one of the few references to the existence of tardigrades in the history of the earth, and its largely modern appearance shows that tardigrades must have diversified considerably before this time.

The species was first described in 1964 by Kenneth W. Cooper, the typological specimen is now in the Museum of Comparative Zoology at Harvard University. The generic name Beorn was chosen by Cooper in reference to a character of the same name from the children's book The Hobbit by J. R. R. Tolkien, which can occur both in the shape of a man and that of a bear. The specific name leggi goes back to the student William M. Legg, who in the summer of 1940 created a larger collection of amber, in which also the tardigrade copy was found. He died in 1953 before finishing his thesis at Princeton University. Cooper, his friend and scientific mentor, named Beorn leggi after him.

Characteristics
The only known individual is enclosed in honey-colored amber, the length, width and height of which are given as 7, 6 and 3 millimeters. The animal itself is 0.3 millimeters long and 0.08 millimeters wide; As is the case with modern tardigrades, the cylindrical body is flattened on the ventral side.

The cuticle is smooth, slightly thickened on the backside, but does not harden to platelets (sclerites), so that Beorn is one of the "naked" tardigrades. A total of four furrows extend transversely to the longitudinal axis of the body (transversally) around the whole body, which divide these superficially into five regions:
The first or prostomial region forms the head on which there are no structures, such as filiform cirri or clavicles, which are used in some modern modes of sensory perception; Even eyes can not be identified. The mouth environment is inconspicuous and apparently does not have warren-like projections (papillae).
The second region is the first fuselage segment, where the first pair of legs are located. On the back is a short transverse furrow, which is slightly displaced towards the back, opposite the center line of the segment.
The third and fourth regions bear the second and third pairs of legs. Here, too, there are shorter transverse furrows on the back, which run out laterally to the leg shoulder. They are, however, shifted forward against the center line of the segment.
In the fifth region there is a transverse furrow on the abdomen, which runs out slightly laterally on the back line.

The length ratio of the segments 2 to 5 is indicated as 1: 1.3: 1.3: 2.

The legs are presumably telescopically retracted and each carry four unequally long claws arranged asymmetrically with respect to the middle of the leg. Other features, such as the structure of the stiletto apparatus or the mucous musculature, can not be recognized; Also the position of the sex opening (gonopore) with respect to the anus, which could have given further indications of the class belonging to the species, can not be ascertained.

Habitat
The origin of the present amber specimen is unknown; It was part of secondary sediment deposits on the lake shore of Cedar Lake, not far from the Saskatchewan River outlet and southeast of The Pas town in the Canadian province of Manitoba. Observations suggest that the habitat of Beorn leggi was a swamp-like wetland biotope.

Classification
The affiliation of Beorn leggi to the tardigrades may be considered assured; Moreover, the species can even be assigned to one of the three modern classes - the absence of head structures such as Cirri and Clavae and back armorings suggests a division into the Eutardigrada. Within this class, Beorn leggi is placed in a separate family Beornidae, which however has to be regarded as a pure form taxon. However, other studies have subsequently interpreted it as having affinities with Hypsibiidae.

Accompanying finds
Together with Beorn leggi, a young animal has been found which is only very poorly preserved, so that hardly any statements regarding its specific characteristics are possible beyond the identification as a bearded animal. Because two hard-to-recognize structures at or near the head can be interpreted as Cirrus and Clava, it is sometimes viewed as part of the heterotardigrada; However, this identification can not be considered as secured. There is probably no close relationship with Beorn leggi.

References

Parachaela
Tardigrade genera
†Beorn (tardigrade)
Fossil taxa described in 1964
Campanian genera
Canadian amber
Organisms named after Tolkien and his works